Merlaut is a commune in the Marne department in north-eastern France.

Geography
The Chée forms most of the commune's north-eastern border, flows westward through the commune, then flows (at Vitry-en-Perthois) into the Saulx, which forms most of the commune's southern border.

See also
Communes of the Marne department

References

Communes of Marne (department)